James Edward Bagshaw (1874 – 19 January 1941) was an English professional footballer who played as a goalkeeper.

References

1874 births
1941 deaths
Footballers from Grimsby
English footballers
Association football goalkeepers
Grimsby Thursday F.C. players
Grimsby Town F.C. players
Grimsby All Saints F.C. players
Gainsborough Trinity F.C. players
Scarborough F.C. players
English Football League players